PAF Base Kohat  is an airbase of the Pakistan Air Force (PAF) located in Kohat, Khyber Pakhtunkhwa, Pakistan. While it currently serves as a training base for PAF airmen, the facility was also used as a major operational base of the Royal Air Force during British colonial rule.

Notable incidents 

 On 20 February 2003, Air Chief Marshal Mushaf Ali Mir and 16 others were killed when their Fokker F27 crashed into the hills near the airbase. The aircraft was inbound to Kohat from PAF Base Nur Khan. Among the deceased were two Air Vice-Marshals and Mir's wife.
 On 6 August 2007, two Pakistan Air Force personnel and a child accompanying them were injured when a bomb exploded near their vehicle on Kohat Road, near the PAF airbase.

References

External links
 Kohat Airbase at Global Security

Pakistan Air Force bases
Military installations in Khyber Pakhtunkhwa